Simone is a given name that may be used as a masculine or feminine name, depending on the language.

Originating from the Greek translation of the Hebrew name Shimon, it became popular due to the Christianization of Europe and Biblical figures such as Simeon (son of Jacob) and Simeon (Gospel of Luke). In Italian, Simone is a masculine name or patronymic surname, pronounced with three syllables, see-MO-ne, whilst the feminine form Simona is widespread throughout Europe. In French and English Simone is a feminine name, pronounced with two syllables, either as SEE-MAWN or sə-MON, whilst its masculine form in both languages is Simon/Simeon. Additionally, Simone, as a feminine name, may be spelled Simonne outside of France.

People

Simona
Simona Amânar (born 1979), Romanian gymnast
Simona Andrejić (born 1994), Serbian model 
Simona de Silvestro (born 1988), Swiss race car driver
Simona Halep (born 1991), Romanian tennis player
Simona Koch (born 1968), German diver
Simona Krupeckaitė (born 1982), Lithuanian track cyclist 
Simona Malpezzi (born 1972), Italian politician 
Simona Orinska (born 1978), Latvian butoh artist
Simona Peycheva (born 1985), Bulgarian rhythmic gymnast 
Simona Richter (born 1972), Romanian judoka
Simona Rinieri (born 1977), Italian volleyball player
Simona Stašová (born 1955), Czech actress
Simona Škrabec (born 1968), Slovene writer 
Simona Ventura (born 1965), Italian TV hostess

Simone
Simone Alaimo (born 1950), Italian bass-baritone
Simone Alberghini (born 1973), Italian baritone
Simone Aldrovandi (born 1994), Italian footballer
Simone Alessio (born 2000), Italian taekwondo practitioner
Simone Ambrogio (born 2000), Italian footballer
Simone Andreetta (born 1993), Italian cyclist
Simone Angel (born 1971), Dutch TV host
Simone Antonini (born 1991), Italian cyclist
Simone Anzani (born 1992), Italian volleyball player
Simone Aresti (born 1986), Italian footballer
Simone Arrigoni (born 1973), Italian free-diver
Simone Askew, American Army officer
Simone Asselborn-Bintz (born 1966), Luxembourgian educator and politician
Simone Assemani (1752–1821), Italian Orientalist
Simone Aughterlony (born 1977), New Zealand dancer and choreographer
Simone Augustin (born 1976), German journalist and author
Simone Auriletto (born 1998), Italian footballer
Simone Bacciocchi (born 1977), Sammarinese footballer
Simone Badal-McCreath, Jamaican chemist and cancer researcher
Simone Bagel-Trah (born 1969), German businesswoman
Simone Bagnoli (born 1981), Italian basketball player
Simone Baldelli (born 1976), Italian politician
Simone Ballachi (1240–1319), Italian gardener
Simone Ballard (1897–1974), French mezzo-soprano
Simone Balli, Italian painter
Simone Balsamino, Italian composer
Simone Barabino, Italian painter
Simone Barck (1944–2007), German historian
Simone Barone (born 1978), Italian footballer
Simone Barontini (born 1999), Italian middle-distance runner
Simone Bartolini, Italian sopranist
Simone Basso (born 1982), Italian footballer
Simone Bastoni (born 1996), Italian footballer
Simone Battle (1989–2014), American actress and singer
Simone Bauer (born 1973), German fencer
Simone Beck (1904–1991), French cookbook author and cooking teacher
Simone Bell, American politician
Simone Bendix (born 1967), Danish actress
Simone Benedetti (born 1992), Italian footballer
Simone Benedettini (born 1997), Sammarinese footballer
Simone Benmussa (1932–2001), French writer and theatre director
Simone Bentivoglio (born 1985), Italian footballer
Simone Berardi (born 1979), Italian footballer
Simone Bernardini (born 1991), Italian cyclist
Simone Berriau (1896–1984), French actress
Simone Bertazzo (born 1982), Italian bobsledder
Simone Berti (born 1985), Italian basketball player
Simone Bertoletti (born 1974), Italian cyclist
Simone Bevilacqua (born 1997), Italian cyclist
Simone Bianchi (artist) (born 1972), Italian comic book artist, painter, and graphic artist
Simone Bianchi (athlete) (born 1973), Italian long-jumper
Simone Biasci, Italian cyclist
Simone Bignall, Australian philosopher
Simone Biles (born 1997), American gymnast
Simone Bittencourt de Oliveira (born 1949), Brazilian popular music (MPB) singer
Simone Bitton (born 1955), French-Moroccan filmmaker
Simone Blanc, French canoeist
Simone Blum (born 1989), German show jumper
Simone Boccanegra (died 1363), Doge of Genoa
Simone Bocchino (born 1978), Italian musician
Simone Böhme (born 1991), Danish handball player
Simone Boilard (born 2000), Canadian cyclist
Simone Boldini (born 1954), Italian footballer
Simone Bolelli (born 1985), Italian tennis player
Simone Bonadies (died 1518), Italian Roman Catholic bishop
Simone Bonomi (born 1980), Italian footballer
Simone Borgheresi (born 1968), Italian cyclist
Simone Borrelli (born 1985), Italian actor, director, singer, songwriter and musician
Simone Mary Bouchard (1912–1945), Canadian painter and textile artist
Simone Bourday (1912–1943), French actress
Simone Boye Sørensen (born 1992), Danish footballer
Simone Bracalello (born 1985), Italian footballer
Simone Branca (born 1992), Italian footballer
Simone Brentana (1656–1742), Italian painter
Simone Brièrre (born 1937),  French hurdler
Simone Brocard (born 1752), French slave trader
Simone Browne (born 1973), Canadian sociologist
Simone Bruni (born 1993), Italian-born Colombian footballer
Simone Buchanan (born 1968), Australian actress
Simone Buitendijk (born 1958), Dutch academic
Simone Buti (born 1983), Italian volleyball player
Simone Cadamuro (born 1976), Italian cyclist
Simone Cairoli (born 1990), Italian decathlete
Simone Callender (born 1978), British judoka
Simone Calori (born 1980), Italian footballer
Simone Calvano (born 1993), Italian footballer
Simone Campagnaro (born 1986), Italian cyclist
Simone Campbell (born 1945), American religious sister, lawyer and lobbyist
Simone Cantarini (1612–1648), Italian painter and engraver
Simone Cantoni (1736–1818), Swiss architect
Simone Caputo (born 1998), Italian footballer
Simone Carmichael (born 1977), New Zealand footballer
Simone Carretta, Italian painter
Simone Caruso (born 1994), Italian footballer
Simone Cavalli (born 1979), Italian footballer
Simone Cavens, American actress
Simone Cecchetti (born 1973), Italian portrait photographer
Simone Cercato (born 1975), Italian swimmer
Simone Cerdan (1897–1967), French singer and actress
Simone Chapuis-Bischof (born 1931), Swiss activist
Simone Charley (born 1995), American soccer player
Simone Tanner Chaumet (1916–1962), French peace activist
Simone Chiavari, Italian Roman Catholic bishop
Simone Chrisostome (1923–2021), member of the French Resistance
Simone Christensen (born 1994), Danish BMX rider
Simone Ciancio (born 1987), Italian footballer
Simone Cilio (born 1992), Italian film composer
Simone Cipriani (born 1964), Italian official of the United Nations
Simone Ciulli (born 1986), Italian swimmer
Simone Clarke (born 1970), English ballerina
Simone Collio (born 1979), Italian sprinter
Simone Colombi (born 1991), Italian footballer
Simone Colombo (born 1963), Italian tennis player
Simone Confalone (born 1974), Italian footballer
Simone Consonni (born 1994), Italian cyclist
Simone Corazza (born 1991), Italian footballer
Simone Corsi (born 1987), Italian motorcycle racer
Simone Couderc (1911–2005), French mezzo-soprano
Simone Créantor (1948–2020), French shot putter
Simone Cristicchi (born 1977), Italian singer-songwriter
Simone da Cusighe, Italian painter
Simone D'Aillencourt (1930–2017), French model
Simone Dallamano (born 1983), Italian footballer
Simone D'Andrea (born 1974), Italian voice actor
Simone da Orsenigo, Italian architect
Simone Alves da Silva (born 1984), Brazilian long-distance runner
Simone de Beauvoir (1908–1986), French author and philosopher
Simone Decker (born 1968), Luxembourgian artist
Simone De Haan (born 1953), Australian trombonist
Simone dei Crocifissi (1330–1399), Italian painter
Simone de la Chaume (1908–2001), French amateur golfer
Simone De La Rue, American dancer and fitness expert
Simone Del Duca (1912–2004), French businesswoman
Simone Dell'Acqua (born 1989), Italian footballer
Simone Dell'Agnello (born 1992), Italian footballer
Simone Del Nero (born 1981), Italian footballer
Simone del Pollaiolo (1457–1508), Florentine architect
Simone del Tintore (1630–1708), Italian painter
Simone de Magistris (died 1613), Italian painter and sculptor
Simone de Mari, Italian sailor
Simone Dénéchaud (1905–1974), Canadian painter and educator
Simone de Oliveira (born 1938), Portuguese singer and TV actress
Simone de' Prodenzani, Italian poet
Simone di Nanni Ferrucci (born 1402), Italian sculptor
Simone Dinnerstein (born 1972), American classical pianist
Simone Di Pasquale (born 1978), Italian dancer
Simone Doria (admiral) (born 1135), Genoese admiral
Simone Drexel (born 1957), Swiss singer-songwriter
Simone Duvalier (1913–1997), First Lady of Haiti
Simone Edera (born 1997), Italian footballer
Simone Edwards (born 1973), Jamaican basketball player
Simone Egeriis (born 1992), Danish singer
Simone Elkeles (born 1970), American young-adult romance novelist
Simone Ellegeest, Belgian cyclist
Simone Emmanuello (born 1994), Italian footballer
Simone Ercoli (born 1979), Italian swimmer
Simone Eriksrud (born 1970), Norwegian musician
Simone Esposito (born 1990), Italian footballer
Simone Facey (born 1985), Jamaican sprinter
Simone Falloni (born 1991), Italian hammer thrower
Simone Farelli (born 1983), Italian footballer
Simone Farina (born 1982), Italian footballer
Simone Fattal (born 1942), Lebanese-American artist
Simone Fautario (born 1987), Italian footballer
Simone Favaro (born 1988), Italian rugby union player
Simone Felice, Italian engraver
Simone Ferrari (footballer) (born 1999), Italian footballer
Simone Ferrari (rugby union) (born 1994), Italian rugby union player
Simone Ferrucci (1437–1493), Italian sculptor
Simone Finn, Baroness Finn (born 1968), British politician
Simone Fischer-Hübner (born 1963), Swedish computer scientist
Simone Fontana (born 1991), Italian bobsledder
Simone Fontecchio (born 1995), Italian basketball player
Simone Forbes (born 1981), Jamaican sportswoman
Simone Forlani (born 1974), Italian rower
Simone Forte (born 1996), Italian triple jumper
Simone Forti (born 1935), Italian-born American artist
Simone Fraccaro (born 1952), Italian cyclist
Simone Franchini (born 1998), Italian footballer
Simone Gallimard (1917–1995), French editor
Simone Andrea Ganz (born 1993), Italian footballer
Simone Gavinet, French canoeist
Simone Gbagbo (born 1949), Ivorian politician
Simone Genatt, American theatre producer
Simone Genevois (1912–1995), French actress
Simone Ghidotti (born 2000), Italian footballer
Simone Ghini (1400–1491), Italian sculptor
Simone Giannelli (born 1996), Italian volleyball player
Simone Giertz (born 1990), Swedish TV host
Simone Gilges (born 1973), German contemporary artist
Simone Giuliani (born 1973), Italian musician
Simone Giuliano (born 1997), Italian footballer
Simone Gold, American anti-vaccine activist, founder of America's Frontline Doctors
Simone Gonin (born 1989), Italian curler
Simone Gouws (born 1999), South African field hockey player
Simone Gozzi (born 1986), Italian footballer
Simone Greiner-Petter-Memm (born 1967), German cross-country skier and biathlete
Simone Greselin (born 1998), Italian footballer
Simone Griffeth (born 1950), American actress
Simone Rao Grimaldi (died 1616), Italian Roman Catholic bishop
Simone Grippo (born 1988), Swiss footballer
Simone Grotzkyj (born 1988), Italian motorcycle racer
Simone Guerra (born 1989), Italian footballer
Simone Guerri (born 1982), Italian footballer
Simone Guillissen (1916–1996), Belgian architect
Simone Haak (born 1952), Dutch artist
Simone Hankin (born 1973), Australian water polo player
Simone Hanner (born 1949), French swimmer
Simone Hanselmann (born 1979), German actress
Simone Harris, Trinidad and Tobago actress
Simone Hauswald (born 1979), German biathlete
Simone Henry (born 1938), French sprinter
Simone Hindmarch (born 1968), English swimmer
Simone Hines (born 1975), American singer
Simone Holtznagel (born 1993), Australian model
Simone Hudon-Beaulac (1905–1984), Canadian painter and printmaker
Simone Hyams (born 1971), British actress
Simone Iacone (born 1984), Italian racing driver
Simone Iacoponi (born 1987), Italian footballer
Simone Iannarelli (born 1970), Italian composer and classical guitarist
Simone Icardi (born 1996), Italian footballer
Simone Impellizzeri (died 1701), Italian Roman Catholic bishop
Simone Inzaghi (born 1976), Italian footballer
Simone Iocolano (born 1989), Italian footballer
Simone Jacquemard (1924–2009), French writer
Simone Jardim (born 1979), professional pickleball player
Simone Jatobá (born 1981), Brazilian footballer
Simone Johnson (born 1970), English rapper and actress
Simone Jones, Canadian artist
Simone Joseph (born 1982), South African figure skater
Simone Kaho (born 1978), New Zealand poet
Simone Kaljob, Cameroonian footballer
Simone Philip Kamel, Egyptian singer
Simone Keller (born 1980), Swiss pianist
Simone Kennedy (born 1994), English-born Australian cyclist
Simone Kennedy-Doornbos (born 1970), Dutch politician
Simone Kenyon, English performance artist
Simone Kermes (born 1965), German soprano
Simone Kerseboom (born 1984), Dutch politician
Simone Kessell (born 1975), New Zealand actress
Simone Kirby, Irish actress
Simone Kleinsma (born 1958), Dutch actress and singer
Simone Kliass, Brazilian voice actress
Simone Koch (born 1969), German figure skater
Simone Koot (born 1980), Dutch water polo player
Simone Kues (born 1976), German wheelchair basketball player
Simone Kuhn (born 1980), Swiss beach volleyball player
Simone Lafargue (1915–2010), French tennis player
Simone Lahbib (born 1965), Scottish actress
Simone Laidlow (born 1965), English hurdler
Simone Lang (born 1971), German figure skater
Simone Lange (born 1976), German politician
Simone Lässig (born 1964), German historian
Simone Laudehr (born 1986), German footballer
Simone Lazaroo (born 1961), Australian author
Simone Le Bargy (1877–1985), French actress
Simone Legno (born 1977), Italian artist
Simone Leigh (born 1967), American artist
Simone Le Port (1920–2009), French Resistance member
Simone Lia, English cartoonist and author
Simone Arnold Liebster (born 1930), French writer
Simone Lo Faso (born 1998), Italian footballer
Simone Loiodice (born 1989), Italian footballer
Simone Loria (born 1976), Italian footballer
Simone Lovell (born 1934), British actress
Simone Luiz (born 1992), Brazilian rhythmic gymnast
Simone Lunadoro (died 1610), Italian Roman Catholic bishop
Simone Lurçat (1915–2009), French Resistance member
Simone Luzzatto (1583–1663), Italian rabbi
Simone Magill (born 1994), Northern Irish footballer
Simone Magnaghi (born 1993), Italian footballer
Simone Majoli (1520–1597), Italian canon lawyer, bishop and author
Simone Malacarne (born 1989), Italian footballer
Simone Malatesta (born 1982), Italian footballer
Simone Maludrottu (born 1978), Italian boxer
Simone Malusa (born 1974), Italian snowboarder
Simone Mantia (1873–1951), Italian-born American trombonist
Simone Manuel (born 1996), American swimmer
Simone Mareuil (1903–1954), French actress
Simone Mariani (born 1964), Italian-American actor, writer, director and producer
Simone Martini (c. 1284–1344), Italian painter
Simone Masciarelli (born 1980), Italian cyclist
Simone Masini (born 1984), Italian footballer
Simone Mathes (born 1975), German hammer thrower
Simone Mattia (born 1996), Italian footballer
Simone Mayer (1920–2006), French hematologist and author
Simone Mazzocchi (born 1998), Italian footballer
Simone Mazzola (born 1996), Italian motorcycle racer
Simone McAullay (born 1976), Australian actress
Simone McGurk (born 1963), Australian politician
Simone McKinnis, Australian netball player and coach
Simone Meier (born 1965), Swiss middle-distance runner
Simone Melchior (1919–1990), wife and business partner of undersea explorer Jacques-Yves Cousteau
Simone Menezes (born 1977), Brazilian conductor
Simone Merli, Italian electronic musician
Simone Mestaguerra (died 1257), lord of Forlì
Simone Michel-Lévy (1906–1945), French Resistance member
Simone Mikeladze, Georgian nobleman
Simone Minelli (born 1997), Italian footballer
Simone Mirman (1912−2008), French-born British milliner
Simone Missick (born 1982), American actress
Simone Missiroli (born 1986), Italian footballer
Simone Molinaro (c. 1565–1636), Italian composer
Simone Molteni (born 1992), Italian rower
Simone de Montmollin (born 1968), Swiss politician and oenologist
Simone Morgado (born 1967), Brazilian politician and economist
Simone Mori (voice actor) (born 1965), Italian voice actor
Simone Mori (cyclist) (born 1972), Italian cyclist
Simone Moro (born 1967), Italian alpinist
Simone Mortaro (born 1989), Italian footballer
Simone Mosca (1492–1554), Italian sculptor
Simone Moschin (born 1995), Italian footballer
Simone Motta (born 1977), Italian footballer
Simone Muench, American poet
Simone Muratelli, Italian speedway rider
Simone Muratore (born 1998), Italian footballer
Simone Murphy, Scottish model
Simone Nalatu (born 1980), Fijian-Australian netball player
Simone Niggli-Luder (born 1978), Swiss Orienteering World Champion and three time Swiss Sportswoman of the Year
Simone Oliverio (died 1668), Italian Roman Catholic bishop
Simone Opitz (born 1963), East German cross-country skier
Simone Orlando, Canadian ballerina and choreographer
Simone Ortega (1919–2008), Spanish culinary author
Simone Osborne, Canadian lyric and operatic soprano
Simone Osygus (born 1968), German swimmer
Simone Padoin (born 1984), Italian footballer
Simone Palermo (born 1988), Italian footballer
Simone Palombi (born 1996), Italian footballer
Simone Paltanieri (died 1277), Italian Roman Catholic cardinal
Simone Paolini (born 1997), Italian footballer
Simone Papa the Elder (1430–1488), Italian painter
Simone Papa the Younger (1506–1567), Neapolitan fresco painter
Simone Parodi (born 1986), Italian volleyball player
Simone Pasa (born 1994), Italian footballer
Simone Pasqua (1492–1565), Italian Roman Catholic bishop and cardinal
Simone Pasticcio (born 1976), Italian footballer
Simone Patacchiola (born 1991), Italian footballer
Simone Pavan (born 1974), Italian footballer
Simone Pecorini (born 1993), Italian footballer
Simone Pedroni, Italian pianist and conductor
Simone Pepe (born 1983), Italian footballer
Simone Perico (born 1989), Italian footballer
Simone Perilli (born 1995), Italian footballer
Simone Perrotta (born 1977), Italian footballer
Simone Pesce (born 1982), Italian footballer
Simone Peter (born 1965), German politician
Simone Petersen (born 1997), Danish handball player
Simone Peterzano (1535–1599), Italian painter
Simone Petilli (born 1993), Italian cyclist
Simone Petrangeli (born 1975), Italian politician and lawyer
Simone Pianetti (born 1858), Italian anarchist
Simone Pianigiani (born 1969), Italian basketball coach
Simone Pignoni (1611–1698), Italian painter
Simone Pinna (born 1997), Italian footballer
Simone Pinzani (born 1972), Italian skier and combined skier
Simone Pizzuti (born 1990), Italian footballer
Simone Plé-Caussade (1897–1986), French music educator, composer and pianist
Simone Pontello (born 1971), Brazilian basketball player
Simone Pontiggia (born 1993), Italian footballer
Simone Pontisso (born 1997), Italian footballer
Simone Ponzi (born 1987), Italian cyclist
Simone Porzio (1496–1554), Italian philosopher
Simone Pratt (born 1996), Bahamian tennis player
Simone Prendergast (1930–2012), English legal professional and philanthropist
Simone Prutsch (born 1978), Austrian badminton player
Simone Puleo (born 1979), Italian footballer
Simone Raffini (born 1996), Italian footballer
Simone Ragusi (born 1992), Italian rugby union player
Simone Raineri (born 1977), Italian rower
Simone Rapisarda Casanova (born 1970), Italian experimental filmmaker
Simone Rapp (born 1992), Swiss footballer
Simone Rasmussen (born 1993), Danish handball player
Simone Ravanelli (born 1995), Italian cyclist
Simone Renant (1911–2004), French actress
Simone Rignault (1943–2019), French politician
Simone Ritscher (born 1959), German actress
Simone Rizzato (born 1981), Italian footballer
Simone Robertson (born 1975), Australian actress
Simone Carafa Roccella (died 1676), Italian Roman Catholic bishop
Simone Rocha (born 1986), Irish fashion designer
Simone Romagnoli (born 1990), Italian footballer
Simone Rosalba (born 1976), Italian volleyball player
Simone Rossi (born 1968), Italian businessman
Simone Rossmann (born 1978), Austrian designer
Simone Rosso (born 1995), Italian footballer
Simone Rota (born 1984), Filipino footballer
Simone Ruas (1919–2001), French athlete
Simone Ruffini (born 1989), Italian swimmer
Simone Russini (born 1996), Italian footballer
Simone Šaback (born 1956), Brazilian composer, writer, screenwriter, poet and journalist
Simone Sabbioni (born 1996), Italian swimmer
Simone Fernando Sacconi (1895–1973), Italian violin maker
Simone Antonio Saint-Bon (1828–1892), Italian admiral
Simone Sales (born 1988), Italian footballer
Simone Salviato (born 1987), Italian footballer
Simone Sancioni (born 1988), Italian motorcycle racer
Simone Sanna (born 1978), Italian motorcycle racer
Simone Sannibale (born 1986), Italian footballer
Simone Santarelli (born 1988), Italian footballer
Simone Santi (born 1966), Italian volleyball referee
Simone Scatizzi (1931–2010), Italian Roman Catholic bishop
Simone Schaller (1912–2016), American hurdler
Simone Scherer (born 1994), Swiss trampolinist
Simone Schilder (born 1967), Dutch tennis player
Simone Schmiedtbauer (born 1974), Austrian politician
Simone Schneider, German operatic soprano
Simone Schwarz-Bart (born 1938), French novelist and playwright
Simone Schweber, American scholar
Simone Scozzari (born 1900), Sicilian mobster
Simone Scuffet (born 1996), Italian footballer
Simone Segouin (1925–2023), French Resistance member
Simone Sello (born 1968), Italian guitarist and record producer
Simone Sereni (born 1968), Italian footballer
Simone Severini, Italian-born British physicist
Simone Sheffield, American film and television producer
Simone Signoret (1921–1985), French actress
Simone Silva (1928–1957), Egyptian-born French actress
Simone Simeri (born 1993), Italian footballer
Simone Simon (1910–2005), French film actress
Simone Simoni (1532–1602), Italian philosopher and physician
Simone Simons (born 1985), Dutch mezzo-soprano singer
Simone Singh (born 1974), Indian actress
Simone Sini (born 1992), Italian footballer
Simone Smith (Canadian film editor), Canadian film editor
Simone Smith (British film editor), Scottish film director and film editor
Simone Soares (born 1977), Brazilian actress
Simone Solinas (born 1996), Italian footballer
Simone Spoladore (born 1979), Brazilian actress
Simone Stacey (born 1977), Australian singer-songwriter
Simone Stella (born 1981), Italian harpsichordist, organist and composer
Simone Stelzer (born 1969), Austrian singer
Simone Sterbini (born 1993), Italian cyclist
Simone Storm (born 1969), Brazilian volleyball player
Simone Stortoni (born 1985), Italian cyclist
Simone Stratigo (1733–1824), Greek-Italian mathematician and nautical scientist
Simone Sylvestre (1923–2020), French actress
Simone Tascone (born 1997), Italian footballer
Simone Tata (born 1930), Swiss-born Indian businesswoman
Simone Tebet (born 1970), Brazilian politician
Simone Techert, X-ray physicist
Simone Tempestini (born 1994), Romanian rally driver
Simone Terenzani (born 1978), Italian speedway rider
Simone Téry (1897–1967), French journalist
Simone Theis (born 1940), Luxembourgian swimmer
Simone Thiero (born 1993), Congolese handball player
Simone Thomalla (born 1965), German actress
Simone Thomaschinski (born 1970), German field hockey player
Simone Thompson (born 1996), American model and actress
Simone Thust (born 1971), German race walker
Simone Tiribocchi (born 1978), Italian footballer
Simone Tomassini (born 1974), Italian singer-songwriter
Simone Tonelli (born 1991), Italian footballer
Simone Urdl, Canadian film producer
Simone Valère (1923–2010), French actress
Simone van der Vlugt (born 1966), Dutch writer
Simone Vagnozzi (born 1983), Italian tennis player
Simone Vanni (born 1979), Italian foil fencer
Simone Vaturi (born 1988), Italian ice dancer
Simone Vaudry (1906–1993), French actress
Simone Veil (1927–2017), French lawyer and politician
Simone Velasco (born 1995), Italian cyclist
Simone Velzeboer (born 1967), Dutch short track speed skater
Simone Venier (born 1984), Italian rower
Simone Verdi (born 1992), Italian footballer
Simone Vergassola (born 1976), Italian footballer
Simone Verovio (died 1607), Dutch calligrapher, engraver, printer and editor
Simone Villanova (born 1984), Italian footballer
Simone Vitale (born 1986), Italian footballer
Simone Waisbard, French explorer
Simone Warzel (born 1973), German mathematical physicist
Simone Wearne (born 1980), Australian baseball player
Simone Weil (1909–1943), French philosopher and activist
Simone Weiler (born 1978), German swimmer
Simone Wendler (born 1955), German chemist and journalist
Simone Wild (born 1993), Swiss alpine ski racer
Simone Wilson (politician) (born 1976), Australian politician
Simone White (writer) (born 1972), American poet
Simone White (born 1970), American singer-songwriter
Simone Wilkie (born 1964), Australian Army officer
Simone Young (born 1961), Australian conductor
Simone Zaggia (born 1965), Italian astronomer
Simone Zanon (born 1975), Italian long-distance runner
Simone Zaza (born 1991), Italian footballer
Simone Zgraggen (born 1975), Swiss violinist
Simone Zucato (born 1976), Brazilian actress

Simonne
Simonne Lizotte, Canadian politician
Simonne Monet-Chartrand, Canadian social activist

Fictional characters and pseudonyms
Simone, the pet dog in The Partridge Family TV series
Simone, a fictional character on the 2002 film S1m0ne, played by Rachel Roberts
Simone, Shane Botwin's school friend from Weeds, portrayed by Jillian Rose Reed (2008–2009)
Simone Adamley, a student from Ferris Bueller's Day Off, portrayed by Kristy Swanson
Simone Deveaux, fictional character on the TV show Heroes (2006–2007)
Simone Grove, a character from the TV series Why Women Kill, portrayed by Lucy Liu
Simone Lenoir, a cartoon character from the 1998 film Scooby-Doo on Zombie Island, voiced by Adrienne Barbeau
Simone Loveday, a character from the British soap opera Hollyoaks, played by Jacqueline Boatswain (2015–2019)
Simone Sinclair, a character from the TV series, Switched at Birth, played by Maiara Walsh

See also
Jimena

References

English feminine given names
French feminine given names
Italian masculine given names
Spanish feminine given names
Lithuanian feminine given names
Sammarinese given names